Pseudophaloe schausii is a moth of the family Erebidae first described by Henry Edwards in 1884. It is found in Mexico and Guatemala.

The specimens found along the central and western coast of Mexico are slightly smaller and belong to the form veranioides.

References

Moths described in 1884
Pseudophaloe